Ojivolta are an American record production and songwriting duo, composed of Mark Williams and Raul Cubina. Their credits include production and co-writing for Kanye West, Playboi Carti, XXXTentacion, Lil Nas X, Justin Bieber, Jon Bellion, and Halsey, among others.

Awards and nominations

Discography

References

External links 

 Ojivolta - AllMusic
 Raul Cubina - AllMusic
 Mark Williams - AllMusic

Record production duos
Songwriting teams
Living people
American hip hop record producers
American musical duos